Bantam is a borough in Litchfield County, Connecticut, United States. The population was 759 at the 2010 census.

While separated for census and historic reasons, Bantam is governed as an integral part of the town of Litchfield. Bantam is the 2nd least populous borough in Connecticut, only beaten by Fenwick.

On July 10, 1989, many of the buildings in Bantam were heavily damaged by a tornado that ripped through Litchfield and New Haven Counties. The storm also caused considerable damage to the Litchfield County town of Thomaston, and to the New Haven County towns of Waterbury, Hamden and North Haven.

Geography

Climate 
This climatic region is typified by large seasonal temperature differences, with warm to hot (and often humid) summers and cold (sometimes severely cold) winters.  According to the Köppen Climate Classification system, Bantam has a humid continental climate, abbreviated "Dfb" on climate maps.

Demographics

As of the 2010 census Bantam had a population of 759.  The racial composition of the population was 96.6% white, 1.2% black or African American, 0.3% from other races and 1.8% from two or more races.  3.3% of the population was Hispanic or Latino of any race.

At the 2000 census there were 802 people, 364 households, and 202 families residing in the borough. The racial makeup of the borough was 96.01% White, 0.37% African American, 0.50% Native American, 0.75% Asian, 0.87% from other races, and 1.50% from two or more races. Hispanic or Latino of any race were 2.00%.

Of the 364 households, 28.0% had children under the age of 18 living with them, 44.2% were married couples living together, 6.9% had a female householder with no husband present, and 44.5% were non-families. 40.1% of households were one person, and 25.0% were one person aged 65 or older.  The average household size was 2.20 and the average family size was 3.04.

In the borough the population was spread out, with 25.8% under the age of 18, 3.0% from 18 to 24, 28.8% from 25 to 44, 22.1% from 45 to 64, and 20.3% 65 or older.  The median age was 42 years. For every 100 females, there were 83.9 males.  For every 100 females age 18 and over, there were 84.8 males.

The median household income was $32,167 and the median family income  was $50,938. Males had a median income of $42,000 versus $30,385 for females. The per capita income for the borough was $18,442.  About 3.1% of families and 5.4% of the population were below the poverty line, including 3.1% of those under age 18 and 10.3% of those age 65 or over.

Common ancestries reported were: Irish (21.1%), Italian (14.5%), German (14.0%), English (13.1%), French Canadian (10.1%), French (9.7%).

Education
Residents are zoned to Litchfield Public Schools including Litchfield High School.

References

External links

 Borough of Bantam official website

Litchfield, Connecticut
Boroughs in Connecticut
Boroughs in Litchfield County, Connecticut